József Solymosi is a Hungarian-Canadian mathematician and a professor of mathematics at the University of British Columbia. His main research interests are arithmetic combinatorics, discrete geometry, graph theory, and combinatorial number theory.

Education and career
Solymosi earned his master's degree in 1999 under the supervision of László Székely from the Eötvös Loránd University and his Ph.D. in 2001 at ETH Zürich under the supervision of Emo Welzl. His doctoral dissertation was Ramsey-Type Results on Planar Geometric Objects.

From 2001 to 2003 he was S. E. Warschawski Assistant Professor of Mathematics at the University of California, San Diego. He joined the faculty of the University of British Columbia in 2002.

He was editor in chief of the Electronic Journal of Combinatorics from 2013 to 2015.

Contributions
Solymosi was the first online contributor to the first Polymath Project, set by Timothy Gowers to find improvements to the Hales–Jewett theorem.

One of his theorems states that if a finite set of points in the Euclidean plane has every pair of points at an integer distance from each other, then
the set must have a diameter (largest distance) that is linear in the number of points. This result is connected to the Erdős–Anning theorem, according to which an infinite set of points with integer distances must lie on one line. In connection with the related Erdős–Ulam problem, on the existence of dense subsets of the plane for which all distances are rational numbers, Solymosi and de Zeeuw proved that every infinite rational-distance set must either be dense in the Zariski topology or it must have all but finitely many of its points on a single line or circle.

This generalizes the Szemerédi–Trotter theorem on points and lines in the Euclidean plane, and because of this the exponent of  cannot be improved.

He has also contributed improved bounds for the Erdős–Szemerédi theorem, showing that every set of real numbers has either a large set of pairwise sums or a large set of pairwise products, and for the Erdős distinct distances problem, showing that every set of points in the plane has many different pairwise distances.

Recognition
In 2006, Solymosi received a Sloan Research Fellowship and in 2008 he was awarded the André Aisenstadt Mathematics Prize. In 2012 he was named a doctor of the Hungarian Academy of Science.

Selected publications

References

External links
Home page

Year of birth missing (living people)
Living people
Canadian mathematicians
20th-century Hungarian mathematicians
21st-century Hungarian mathematicians
Eötvös Loránd University alumni
ETH Zurich alumni
Academic staff of the University of British Columbia
Combinatorialists
Graph theorists